Agapetus ochripes is a species of insect belonging to the family Glossosomatidae.

It is native to Europe.

References

Glossosomatidae